Reveal is the debut studio album by South Korean boy group The Boyz. It was released on February 10, 2020 through Cre.Ker Entertainment. The album consists of nine tracks.

Background 
On February 10, the Boyz released their first studio album Reveal and its lead single "Reveal".

Track listing

Charts

Release history

References 

2020 albums
The Boyz (South Korean band) albums